Bobbili Raja (  or ) is a 1990 Indian Telugu-language romantic action film co-written and directed by B. Gopal. Produced by D. Suresh under his banner Suresh Productions, it stars Venkatesh and Divya Bharti (in her Telugu debut) while Vanisri, Kota Srinivasa Rao, Satyanarayana and Sumithra appear in the supporting roles. Ilaiyaraaja composed the film's music.

Plot
The film begins with election campaigning in the village Bobbili. Sundarayya and Rajeswari Devi are strong opponents in elections. Rajeswari and her elder brother Ahobala Rao use various tactics to win the elections. Still, their younger brother Suryam supports Sundarayya and also loves his daughter Rajyalakshmi, and she becomes pregnant. Everybody dishonors her, and Ahobala wants to take an advantage of the situation in the election campaign. When Suryam decides to reveal the truth to everyone, Ahobala tries to stop him. In that quarrel, Suryam accidentally dies. Ahobala plays a game and keeps the blame on Sundarayya and Rajyalakshmi. Both of them are arrested, but they escape from jail and reach a forest.

After 25 years, Raja, Rajyalakshmi's son, has always lived in the jungle with his mother and grandfather. Rani is Rajeswari's daughter, and she is the minister of forests who have been brought up amidst wealth. Once, Rani visits the forest along with her friends for a tour. Raja guides them in the forest, both of them having silly fights with each other along the way. One day, both are lost in the deep forest. After several adventures, they fall for each other.

Meanwhile, Rajeswari reaches the forest in search of Rani. During the search, she finds that Raja is the Sundarayya's grandson. She catches Sundarayya and Rajyalakshmi and interrogates them. Rajyalakshmi and Rajeswari challenge each other; that she will get her son married to Rani, but Rajeswari says it will never happen. Finally, Rajeswari finds Rani and takes her back. Once Rani learns that Raja is her maternal uncle's son (her Bava), she escapes from home with her father Appa Rao's help and returns to the forest where Rajeswari follows her. Rajyalakshmi hands Rani over to her mother and tells her son will get Rani back honorably, and he will prove his mother is innocent.

Raja enters into Bobbili after listening to his mother's past and decides to teach Rajeswari a lesson. Raja starts the game with Rajeswari by making a threat to her ministry, but she double-crosses him by arresting Rajyalakshmi in the old murder case. Raja tries for bail, but when the policeman misbehaves with him, Raja fights with them and is arrested. Raja reveals the truth in court, and on his words, the government reacts on Rajyalakshmi and removes her from the ministry. Meanwhile, Ahobala also cheats Rajeswari and forcefully makes Rani's marriage arrangements with his son Amurtha Rao. The incident opens Rajeswari's eyes, and she apologizes to Raja and Rajyalakshmi. Finally, Ahobala admits his mistake, and Raja and Rani get married.

Cast
The cast is listed below:
 Venkatesh as Raja
 Divya Bharati as Rani
 Gummadi as Sundarayya
 Vanisree as Minister Rajeswari Devi
 Kota Srinivasa Rao as Ahobala Rao
 Satyanarayana as Appa Rao
 Brahmanandam as Forest Officer
 Sumitra as Rajyalakshmi
 Sivaji Raja as Amurtha Rao
 Vidya Sagar as Suryam
 Babu Mohan as Bajanappa
 Pradeep Shakthi as Inspector
 Jaya Prakash Reddy as Tribal
 Bhimeswara Rao as Judge
 Chidatala Appa Rao as Forest Guard
 Heera as Servant Rathalu

Soundtrack

Music composed by Ilaiyaraaja. Lyrics written by Sirivennela Sitarama Sastry. Music released on ECHO Music Company.

Release

The film upon release was a major commercial success, and was declared a 'All Time Blockbuster'. Having a 175-day run in 3 centres,  it is considered Venkatesh's first silver-jubilee hit movie. It was later dubbed and released in Tamil as Valiban in June 1992 and in Hindi as Rampur Ka Raja in 1993.

Awards
 Filmfare Award for Best Music Director – Telugu - Ilaiyaraaja

References

External links 
 

1990 films
Indian romantic action films
Films scored by Ilaiyaraaja
Telugu films remade in other languages
1990s masala films
Films directed by B. Gopal
1990s Telugu-language films
Films shot in Belgium
Films shot in Brussels
Films shot in the Netherlands
Films shot in Amsterdam
Suresh Productions films